Destruction and Sorrow Beneath the Heavens is a 2004 book by the Hungarian writer László Krasznahorkai. The narrator, László Stein, travels in China in search of examples of classical Chinese culture and understanding how contemporary Chinese society relates to it. An English translation by Ottilie Mulzet was published in 2016.

Reception
In the Los Angeles Review of Books, Michael LaPointe wrote that "Krasznahorkai channels the works of W.G. Sebald, who saw ashes on every attraction, and — unexpectedly — the novels of Michel Houellebecq, which trace the extension of the domain of the market into the sacred realms of human experience". Publishers Weekly called the book an "occasionally frustrating yet often dazzling travel memoir".

References

External links
 Hungarian publicity page 
 English-language publicity page

2004 novels
Books about China
Hungarian novels
Travel novels
Works by László Krasznahorkai
Magvető books